The president of the Policy and Resources Committee (P&RC president), also known as the Chief Minister of Guernsey, is the head of government of Guernsey and chair of the Policy and Resources Committee. The head of government is not directly elected by the people but rather by the legislature, the States of Guernsey.

Peter Ferbrache is the second and current president of the Policy and Resources Committee. He took office on 16 October 2020, following the 2020 general election.

History
Following a reform of the institutions of Guernsey adopted in July 2015, a five-member senior committee, Policy and Resources Committee, headed by a president was created on 1 May 2016 to replace the Policy Council. The position of Chief Minister, who chaired the Policy Council, was abolished, along with the ministerial government system.

Selection
The 40 members of the States of Guernsey  hold a secret ballot election to determine the president, with successive rounds of voting continuing until an outright winner is elected. All candidates having to be proposed and seconded. The president of the committee is the de facto head of government of Guernsey and may be given the title "Chief Minister".

List of titleholders

References

 
Government of Guernsey
2016 establishments in Guernsey